Robert Ross Ferguson (May 13, 1917 - September 19, 2006) BA (University of Saskatchewan 1946), BSc (University of Regina 1949), CM, S.O.M., LL.D (Hon), University of Regina, exemplified the life of service. Inspired by his father, Dr. R.G. Ferguson, "Bob" was imbued from an early age with a sense of responsibility for his community, his province, and his country. He expressed this commitment early in the 1995 film documentary My Father's Legacy: "I wanted to live my life in a manner in which my father would be proud." And he did.

Public Service
Bob Ferguson's service began with his career in the Royal Canadian Air Force. His subsequent public service included:

 Member, Board of the University of Saskatchewan
 Founding member, Board the University of Regina
 Chair, Alumni Fund, the University of Regina
 Reeve, Municipality of Qu'Appelle
 Chair, Saskatchewan Lung Association
 Member, Edgeley Cooperative Association Board
 Member, Egg Lake Conservation and Development Authority

Recognition
Public recognition followed Bob Ferguson's community service:
 1984 Honorary Doctor of Laws Degree (LL.D), the University of Regina
 1986 "Distinguished Graduate in Agriculture" the University of Saskatchewan
 1987 Order of Canada
 1994 Saskatchewan Order of Merit
 2005 Saskatchewan Centennial Medal

Early life and education
Robert Ross Ferguson was born on May 13, 1917, in Winnipeg, Manitoba. Shortly after his birth, his parents relocated to Fort Qu'Appelle, Saskatchewan, where his father, Dr. R.G. Ferguson, was appointed General Superintendent and Medical Director of the newly established Saskatchewan Anti-Tuberculosis League. This was a challenging period for the family, as Dr. Ferguson was treating his brother, Vernon, who had returned from service in Ypres, Belgium, with tuberculosis. Tragedy befell them when Dr. Ferguson's younger brother, Frank, who served in RFC 87 Squadron, was shot down by German Ace Michael Hutterer during a dogfight near the Canadian-German line in France, and was killed. This occurred on September 3, 1918, close to Marcoyne. Matters at home were not helped by the Spanish influenza (also known as H1N1) that lingered as a result of the war, which caused George, Robert's brother, to fall ill and be isolated in the TB Sanatorium.

Bob Ferguson had aspirations of pursuing a career in medicine, similar to his father's, but that was not meant to be. Instead, he began studying agriculture at the University of Regina in 1937. As with so many individuals of his generation, his education was cut short by the outbreak of World War II.

World War II
Bob Ferguson's flight training took place over the winter of 1940-41. Assigned to Night Fighter (Cougar) Squadron 410, whose job was to protect the coast of Scotland and, later, England. The first official sortie of No. 410 Squadron was from RAF Drem, East Lothian, Scotland, on the night of 4 June 1942, when twelve Beaufighter crews took off. It went on to become the top-scoring night fighter squadron in the RAF Second Tactical Air Force during the period between D-Day and VE-Day.

No. 410 Squadron supported the Allied forces during the Normandy Landings and the Battle of the Bulge, flew nightly patrols and had many of its pilots gain ace status. Two members of No. 410 Squadron, Flight Lieutenant (F/L) Currie and Flying Officer (F/O) Rose, were the first members of the RCAF to see the German V-2 rocket in flight.

While with Squadron 410 Ferguson met and became roommates with John Aiken (later Sir John Aiken). Aiken later became Chief Air Marshal of the RAF. Much later he was to say of Ferguson: "A natural leader, Bob Ferguson cared deeply for his squadron and it showed in the respect he showed his pilots and his initiative in improving skills. Indeed to me he personified the success of the British Commonwealth Air Training Plan."

Ferguson was promoted rapidly, achieving the rank of Flying Officer in October 1942, Flight Lieutenant in January 1943, and Squadron Leader in January 1944.

Ferguson quickly developed a reputation for innovative training and meticulous preparation with his squadron. He identified several weaknesses in the aerial gunnery courses which were all taught on Spitfires while most pilots flew other more heavily armoured aircraft. Hearing his criticism Wing Commander Archie Winskill of RAF Winfield called on Ferguson to set up and develop a twin-engine gunnery course. He did, the course was very successful and soon pilots brought their own de Havilland Mosquito or Beaufighter planes with them for training from all over the UK. The students were interviewed continually to refine the course and further improve the training before the pilots were posted to aerial combat.

Bob, too, flew a Mosquito fighter/ bomber during WWll. When the Mosquito entered production in 1941, it was one of the fastest operational aircraft in the world. Entering widespread service in 1942, the Mosquito supported RAF strategic night fighter defence forces in the United Kingdom from Luftwaffe raids, most notably defeating the German aerial offensive Operation Steinbock in 1944. Offensively, the Mosquito units also conducted nighttime fighter sweeps in indirect and direct protection of RAF Bomber Command's heavy bombers to help reduce RAF bomber losses in 1944 and 1945.

Home on leave in September 1944 Bob was invited to "pin" the wings on his younger brother David at his graduation as a pilot and air gunner in the RCAF.

Bob Ferguson gave up flying after the war but maintained a keen interest in his beloved 410 Squadron, later led by his brother-in-law, Wing Commander Keith Fallis. Now responsible for ensuring the safety of Canada's domestic airspace Cougar Squadron currently operates out of Cold Lake Alberta as the operational training squadron for Canada's CF-18 fleet.

After the War
Ferguson returned to the University of Saskatchewan to complete his degree.
He had begun farming before the war and resumed it when the war ended, at the same time finishing his Bachelor of Arts degree (1946) from the University of Saskatchewan and Bachelor of Science in Agriculture in 1949. 

His 1946 graduation marked a memorable occasion: his father received an honorary Doctor of Laws degree at the same ceremony. "When I got my BA, he got his Honorary Doctor of Laws. And when I went across the stage to pick up my diploma, my father bowed graciously as I went by" he recalled in an interview with The University of Regina's Alumni Magazine in Fall 1999.

In the film 'My Father's Legacy' he recounts his father saying, "Now that you have received your degree you must remember that you have only paid for a small part of the cost of your education. What are you going do for your community, your province and your country to help repay the cost of the education for which they have paid for you."

His father's call to action on graduation day was all the motivation he needed. With characteristic understatement, he said, "When dad asked me what I was going to do it got me thinking." Despite his disappointment at not being able to follow in his father's footsteps by establishing a medical career, he found another vocation: farming.

Farming opened the door to extensive involvement in community service, particularly in support of Saskatchewan's two universities. As a University of Regina alumnus, he helped build the alumni association, serving on the board from its inception. In that capacity, he helped establish awards for excellence to honour professors' research and teaching and was the first chair of the scholarship committee. He saw scholarships as a way to give back to the institution and has established three at the University of Regina.

Bob Ferguson had a happy family life. He was devoted to his wife Norma, giving her roses every week of their 57 years of marriage. In 1999 he told the U of R Alumni Magazine: "I've had a most exciting and interesting life. I look back on it and I just wouldn't have changed anything." He died on September 19, 2006, in Regina, Saskatchewan, leaving four children and six grandchildren.

Bob lived his life in a way in which his father would be proud. He had been deeply inspired by his father's values and ideals. Characteristically, one of his last official acts was to sign the letters for the 2006 Christmas Seals Campaign for the Saskatchewan Lung Association. He said, "If the Lung Association has benefited from our association half as much as I have then it has been time well spent."

by 4488.win like online casino

References 

1917 births
Royal Canadian Air Force personnel of World War II
Mayors of places in Saskatchewan
Members of the Order of Canada
Members of the Saskatchewan Order of Merit
2006 deaths